, there were 130 electric vehicles registered in Yukon.

Government policy
, the territorial government offers tax rebates of $5,000 for electric vehicle purchases. , the territorial government offers tax rebates of $750 for installations of electric vehicle chargers in homes, as well as 75% of the charging station cost for businesses and 90% for municipalities and First Nation governments.

Charging stations
, there were four public AC level 2 charging stations in Yukon. , there were 12 public DC charging stations in Yukon.

References

Yukon
Transport in Yukon